Samih Darwazah (1930 – 15 May 2015) was the founder of Hikma Pharmaceuticals, Jordan's largest pharmaceutical business, the Jordanian Minister of Energy and Mineral Resources from 1995 to 1996, and later a senator in the Jordanian parliament.

Early life
Samih Darwazah was born in Nablus, the son of a tea merchant father.

At the age of 10, he became the youngest child to attend the Arab College of Jerusalem.

He studied for a master's degree at the American University of Beirut, Darwazah received a master's degree from the St. Louis College of Pharmacy, Missouri which he attended on a Fulbright scholarship. In 2010 he was awarded an honorary doctorate from the college.

Career
Darwazeh worked for Eli Lilly from 1964 to 1976, before establishing Hikma Pharmaceuticals in 1978. Between 1995 and 1996 he served as Minister of Energy and Mineral Resources to the Government of Jordan. He also founded the Jordan Trade Association and was a member of the Advisory Economic Council to the King of Jordan. In 2007, Darwazah was named the Ernst & Young Middle East Entrepreneur of the Year. He was named chairman of Capital Bank in Jordan in 2009.

He founded Hikma in 1978 in Amman, Jordan.  With the help of his children who joined the business in its early days, Hikma grew from a small factory in Jordan into the largest regional supplier of pharmaceuticals in the Middle East and North Africa region. The company also expanded outside the MENA region, establishing operations in Europe and the US, and was the first Arab company to export pharmaceutical products to the U.S. in 1996. Today Hikma operates in around 50 countries, selling a broad range of branded generics, generic injectables, non-injectable generics and in-licensed patented products. In 2005, the company floated on the London Stock Exchange and in March 2015 it entered the FTSE 100 index.

Publications
In 2004, Darwazah published his business memoir, Building a Global Success.

Personal life
He was married to Samira Fadli and they had four children, sons Said and Mazen, and daughters May and Hana, all of whom survived him. His son, Said Darwazah, succeeded him as CEO in 2007. 

The Dawraz family founded the Samih Darwaz Center for Innovation Management and Entrepreneurship at the Suliman S. Olayan School of Business at American University of Beirut in 2011.

References

External links
 Prime Ministry of Jordan website
 Westerndailypress.co.uk
 Hikma.com

Businesspeople in the pharmaceutical industry
Palestinian businesspeople
Jordanian businesspeople
2015 deaths
1930 births
American University of Beirut alumni
Saint Louis University alumni
Government ministers of Jordan
Energy ministers of Jordan
Members of the Senate of Jordan